The Hundred of Tungkillo is a cadastral unit of hundred in the southeastern foothills of the Mount Lofty Ranges. One of the 10 hundreds of the County of Sturt, it was proclaimed on 7 August 1851 by Governor Henry Young.

Apart from the towns of Tungkillo in the hundred's west and Palmer in the hundred's east, minor portions of the localities of Mount Pleasant, Birdwood, Mount Torrens, Milendella, Mannum and Rockleigh cross over the western, northern and eastern borders of the hundred, respectively.

Local government
The District Council of Tungkillo was established in 1855, incorporating the entirety of the hundred. In 1935 the council amalgamated with the District of Springton to become part of the new District of Mount Pleaseant. In the late 1990s the councils in the region were shuffled again and Mount Pleasant was dissolved. The Hundred of Tungkillo became the Tungkillo–Palmer ward of the new Mid Murray Council.  the hundred forms a part of the Mid Murray council's Shearer ward.

See also
 Lands administrative divisions of South Australia

References

1851 establishments in Australia
Tungkillo